WHHI (91.3 FM) is a radio station licensed to Highland, Wisconsin, and serving the Dodgeville area. WHHI's 100kw signal covers a large swath of Southwest Wisconsin, Northwest Illinois and Northeast Iowa including into the Dubuque area as well as extreme Southwest portions of Minnesota. The station is part of Wisconsin Public Radio (WPR), and airs WPR's "Ideas Network", consisting of news and talk programming.

WHHI broadcasts in the HD Radio (hybrid) format.

The station signed on in 1952 as the seventh FM station of Wisconsin Educational Radio, forerunner of Wisconsin Public Radio.

Translators
WHHI previously was relayed in Madison on translator W215AQ broadcasting at 90.9. This translator was installed to provide some Ideas Network service to Madison's west side when Ideas Network flagship WHA must reduce its power to an all-but-unlistenable level at night. In 2009, the translator was moved to WHA's license.

See also
Wisconsin Public Radio

External links
Wisconsin Public Radio

References

HHI
Wisconsin Public Radio
NPR member stations